The Hong Kong Sheng Kung Hui (abbreviated SKH), also known as the Hong Kong Anglican Church (Episcopal), is the Anglican church in Hong Kong and Macao. It is the 38th Province of the Anglican Communion. It is also one of the major denominations in Hong Kong and the first in the Anglican Communion to ordain a female priest.

The Province of Hong Kong Sheng Kung Hui is divided into three dioceses in Hong Kong and one missionary area in Macau. Each diocese is led by a bishop and the missionary area is directly led by the Archbishop.

The primate of Hong Kong Sheng Kung Hui holds the title of Archbishop of Hong Kong, and is elected from the diocesan bishops of the province. Andrew Chan is the current Archbishop and Primate and Bishop of Western Kowloon. Timothy Kwok is Bishop of Eastern Kowloon and Matthias Der is Bishop of Hong Kong Island.  The church has approximately 29,000 members.

Anglican Communion 

The Anglican Communion is a global family and a fellowship of churches which trace their roots to the Church of England, with a province being a basic autonomous unit. There are presently 41 independent and self-governing provinces spanning over 160 countries. With well over 100 million members, the Anglican Communion is the third largest church in the world, after the Roman Catholic Church and the Eastern Orthodox Churches.

In the Anglican Communion, there is no central governing authority. Churches uphold and proclaim the Catholic and Apostolic faith. The front-line unit of Church is the "parish". Parishes of similar vicinity are then grouped together to form a "diocese". Dioceses sharing similar cultural and national background would unite and form a "province", participating in the Anglican Communion under the leadership and jurisdiction of an archbishop.

The Four Instruments of Unity for the Anglican Communion:

Anglican faith 

The Anglican faith is based on the belief that the Bible, the Holy Scriptures of the Old and the New Testaments, "contain[s] all things necessary to salvation". Hong Kong Sheng Kung Hui further maintains the ministry of the Church which it has received through the Episcopacy in the three orders of Bishops, Priests, and Deacons.

History and origin 
Sheng Kung Hui was founded in British Hong Kong in 1843, following the Treaty of Nanking. The first colonial chaplain was Vincent John Stanton. The first Chinese church, St. Stephen's Church, was founded in 1865. From then onwards, in the course of development of the Anglican Church in Hong Kong and Macao, churches continued to grow and witnessed the establishment of the Diocese of Victoria in 1849 under the See of Canterbury; the establishment of the Kong Yuet Diocese under the Province of the Chung Hua Sheng Kung Hui in 1913, which ran in parallel with the Diocese of Victoria, until it resolved in 1951; and the birth of the Diocese of Hong Kong and Macao in 1951, which was subsequently completely separated from the national Chung Hua Sheng Kung Hui.

In the 40th Synod of the Diocese held in December 1991, it was resolved that steps were to be taken to expand the Diocese into a province and eventually in 1998, the Province of Hong Kong Sheng Kung Hui was established.

Bishops

Diocese of Hong Kong and Macao 
Ronald Owen Hall (1951–1966)
Gilbert Baker (1966–1980)
Peter Kwong Kong-kit (1980–1998)

Hong Kong Sheng Kung Hui

Archbishop and Primate of Hong Kong
Peter Kwong Kong-kit (1998–2006)
Paul Kwong (2007–2021)
Andrew Chan (2021–present)

Bishop of Hong Kong Island
Peter Kwong Kong-kit (1998–2007)
Paul Kwong (2007–2020)
Matthias Der (2021–present)

Bishop of Western Kowloon
Thomas Soo (1998–2012)
Andrew Chan (2012–present)

Bishop of Eastern Kowloon
Louis Tsui (1998–2013)
Timothy Kwok (2014–present)

Structure

Dioceses and Missionary Area 

Hong Kong Sheng Kung Hui consists of three dioceses and one missionary area. There is a bishop in each diocese. The dioceses are:

The Diocese of Hong Kong Island (香港島教區)
The Diocese of Eastern Kowloon (東九龍教區)
The Diocese of Western Kowloon (西九龍教區)

(The Diocese of Eastern Kowloon and the Diocese of Western Kowloon are divided  and along the Kowloon-Canton Railway in Kowloon and New Kowloon.)

The missionary area is:

The Missionary Area of Macao (澳門傳道地區)

Parishes and churches

General synod 
The Provincial General Synod is composed of the House of Bishop, the House of Clegy and the House of Laity. Members come from the Diocese of Hong Kong Island, the Diocese of Eastern Kowloon, the Diocese of Western Kowloon and the Missionary Area of Macao. Under the General Synod, there are different Commissions responsible for different areas of ministry.

Mission and pastoral work 
The Church is a community with no boundaries in age, social or ethnic status. Members include Chinese, other Asians and Westerners from all over the world. The worship in Churches features English, Filipino, Cantonese Chinese and Mandarin Chinese.

 Pastoral Care
 On the parish level, pastoral care is given through fellowships for children, youth, adults, women, elderly and other related groups to cater to the different needs of people of various age groups and background. Retreats, silent meditation, pilgrimage and tours to Palestine are often arranged. Caring for the elderly, family counseling service, spiritual support in hospitals, pastoral care in correctional institutes, mission to Seafarers and religious service at the Airport are some of the Church's services.

 Religious Education
 Religious education of parishes are carried out by Sunday Schools, seminars, disciple training courses and catechism class, among others. The whole Church relies on the Religious Education and Resource Centre to co-ordinate religious education research, provision of religious education curriculum and promotion of religious education. Besides training ordinands, Ming Hua Theological College also provides multi-faceted theological, spiritual and biblical studies for laity.

Social service 
Social service of the Hong Kong Sheng Kung Hui started in mid 18th Century. At present, many social service organizations and social service models in Hong Kong were those initiated and promoted by the Church. Services provided by the Church are multi-faceted, including services for family and child-care, children and youth, the elderly, rehabilitation service, community development service and other supportive services. There are more than 230 units providing social service run by Hong Kong Sheng Kung Hui at present.

In January 2010, the Inland Revenue Department began to pursue the SKH for unpaid taxes in the amount of HK$180 million, relating to a parcel of land in Tai Po which originally housed an orphanage. In 1993, after the closure of the orphanage, the SKH let Cheung Kong Holdings develop luxury apartments on the site, and were estimated to have made profits of HK$450 million in cash, in addition to receiving 120 apartments for free.

Social issues 
On women's ordination, the church was the first in the Anglican Communion to ordain women to the priesthood: Florence Li Tim-Oi in 1944 and another in 1971. Churches in Hong Kong and "Christian clerics are often divided on topics such as... gay rights". In 2007, the former primate, Archbishop Peter Kwong, stated that "Anglicanism is inclusive...so why shouldn't we find a common ground on homosexuality?". Beginning in 2013, some leaders in the Hong Kong Anglican Church endorsed social and civil rights legislation under the auspice of providing protection for LGBT citizens from employment and other varieties of discrimination. The Equal Opportunity Commission chair, York Chow Yat-ngok, who is Anglican, said that gay "people should not be discriminated against" regardless of religious views. Later, in 2015, Peter Douglas Koon, the Anglican province's secretary general, denounced conservative schools' policies against LGBT relationships as discrimination and reassured the public that Anglican educational institutions would welcome LGBT faculty and students.

Education 

There are altogether 33 secondary schools sponsored by Sheng Kung Hui in the territory, amongst which namely:

Primary schools 
Sheng Kung Hui Chu Oi Primary School
Sheng Kung Hui Chu Oi Primary School (Lei Muk Shue)
Sheng Kung Hui Ho Chak Wan Primary School
Sheng Kung Hui Kei Oi Primary School
Sheng Kung Hui Tsing Yi Estate Ho Chak Wan Primary School
Sheng Kung Hui Tsing Yi Chu Yan Primary School
Sheng Kung Hui Holy Spirit Primary School
Sheng Kung Hui MOS Holy Spirit Primary School
Sheng Kung Hui Holy Trinity Primary School
Sheng Kung Hui St Clement's Primary School

Secondary schools 
 Diocesan Boys' School
 Diocesan Girls' School
 Heep Yunn School
 Holy Trinity Church Secondary School
 Lam Woo Memorial Secondary School
 Chan Young Secondary School
 Tang Shiu Kin Secondary School
 St. Mark's School
 Bishop Mok Sau Tseng Secondary School
 St. Paul's Co-educational College
 St. Paul's College
 St. Stephen's College
 St. Stephen's Girls' College

Education reform controversy 

Hong Kong Sheng Kung Hui, with its sponsored primary and secondary schools, were embroiled in the School-Based Management Policy controversy with the government in 2002, five years after the handover.

SKH Ming Hua Theological College 
Hong Kong Sheng Kung Hui runs its own theological college: Ming Hua Theological College, named after Bishop Ronald Owen Hall.
Ming Hua College was established in 1947 by Bishop R.O. Hall in what was then the Church of England’s Diocese of Victoria. It was at first dedicated to the education of Chinese lay Christians, particularly from disadvantaged backgrounds.
In 1996, now part of the Diocese of Hong Kong and Macao, the College was renamed Sheng Kung Hui ("Holy Catholic Church") Ming Hua Theological College and given the responsibility of training priests for full-time ministry in the Church. This work continues today as part of the Anglican Province of Hong Kong and Macao, with Ming Hua being the Provincial training centre for clergy and laity.
The College’s broader identity, now as in 1947, is to encourage active participation in the thoughtful life of the Church. By providing high quality theological programmes, the College has always encouraged members of the Anglican Church to explore deeper understandings of their faith.
Additionally, the strong fellowships founded in mutual respect, support, assistance, understanding and tolerance between all members, helps the study of theology at Ming Hua to move beyond the College and into the wider reaches of our communities.
Much like the local societies of Hong Kong, Kowloon, and Macao, Ming Hua embraces local, national, and international perspectives. Visiting professors and overseas scholars are frequent guests at the College, exchanging and sharing with local members of the Church. The College is also closely involved with its ecumenical partners in the territory, and the Three Self Patriotic Movement of the Protestant Churches in China.

See also 

 Acts of Supremacy
 English Reformation
 Dissolution of the Monasteries
 Ritualism in the Church of England
 Apostolicae curae
 Chung Hua Sheng Kung Hui
 Christianity in Hong Kong
 Roman Catholic Diocese of Hong Kong

References

External links 

 
 SKH Ming Hua Theological College
 SKH Religious Education Resource Center
 Anglican Communion

 
Christian organizations established in 1951
Anglican Communion church bodies
Christianity in Macau
1951 establishments in Hong Kong